Griffin School District 324 is a public school district headquartered in Olympia, Washington, US.  It serves portions of Thurston County to the northwest of Olympia.  
As of May 2011, the district has an enrollment of 657 students.
 
The district operates one K-8 school, the Griffin School.  High school students attend Capital High School in the adjacent Olympia School District.  The Griffin School District operates buses to the high school.

References

External links
School District website
OSPI District Report Card, 2010-11 school year
Griffin School Handbook, district history
 
School districts in Washington (state)
Education in Thurston County, Washington